Elections to Bury Council were held on 4 May 2000.  One third of the council was up for election and the Labour Party kept overall control of the council.  Overall turnout was 27.38%.

After the election, the composition of the council was:
Labour 32
Conservative 13
Liberal Democrat 3

Election result

Ward results

References

2000 English local elections
2000
2000s in Greater Manchester